Tinu Yohannan  (born 18 February 1979) is a former Indian cricketer. He is a right-handed fast medium bowler. He played first class cricket for Kerala and was the first Kerala player to play Test and one day cricket for India. He is the current coach of Kerala cricket team.

A tall athlete, Yohannan was selected in 2000 for the first intake of the National Cricket Academy in Bangalore. This was after he underwent a training session with the MRF Pace Foundation. He made his Test debut in December 2001, in the home series against England. The first Test was played in Mohali, and he dismissed both the English openers. He got his first Test wicket in the fourth ball of his very first over. Though his start was brilliant, he could not carry on with the Indian team due to a form slump. He played 3 Test matches and an equal number of ODI's. His Test bowling average is 51 runs for a wicket..

Tinu is the son of T. C. Yohannan, a long jumper who held the national record for nearly 3 decades and represented India in the 1976 Summer Olympics in Montreal, Quebec, Canada.

He played for Royal Challengers Bangalore in the 2009 edition of the Indian Premier League.

Early life
Tinu not only excelled in cricket in his youth, but also won gold and silver medals in high jump events at junior state-level track and field tournaments.

Career
Tinu made his entry to the Indian cricket team on 3 December 2001 on Test Match against England. His ODI debut was against West Indies on 29 May 2002 in West Indies. He has taken 5 wickets in both Test Matches and in ODIs. He has represented Kerala between 1999 and 2008.

References

External links

1979 births
Living people
Sportspeople from Kollam
India One Day International cricketers
India Test cricketers
South Zone cricketers
Kerala cricketers
Malayali people
Royal Challengers Bangalore cricketers
Cricketers from Kerala